Chiropteris is an extinct genus of plants that existed from the Early Permian (Sakmarian stage) to the Late Jurassic (?Oxfordian stage, maybe latter).

It is unknown whether it belongs in the Matoniaceae or the Dipteridaceae.

Description
The genus Chiropteris was named from fragmentary and whole-plant fossils.
It was constituted of a short 25cm long petiole and a 16cm diameter circular leaf.

Location 
In Brazil, fossil of genus Chiropteris, was located on outcrop in the municipalities of São Jerônimo and Mariana Pimentel. They are in the geopark Paleorrota in Rio Bonito Formation and date from Sakmarian in Permian.

References

Ginkgophyta
Prehistoric plant genera
Permian plants
Triassic plants
Permian first appearances
Triassic extinctions
Prehistoric plants of South America
Permian life of South America
Triassic life of South America
Permian Brazil
Triassic Brazil
Fossils of Brazil
Paraná Basin
Flora of Rio Grande do Sul